Johannes Böhm (1857–1938) was a German geologist and palaeontologist.

He was a researcher in the Prussian Geological Institute in Berlin (Preußische Geologische Landesanstalt)

Works
partial list
Der Grünsand von Aachen und seine Molluskenfauna Bonn, Universitäts Bonn, Buchdruckerei von C. Georgi,1885. online
Die Fossilien von Java auf Grund einer Sammlung von Dr. R.D.M. Verbeek und von Anderen – Die Mollusken der Njalindungsschichten, Schluss: Echinodermata und Arthropoda. with K. Martin and H. Gerth. Leiden, Brill, 1909.Series:Sammlungen des Geologischen Reichs-Museums in Leiden, n.F, Bd.1, Abt.2, Heft 4
Über die obertriadische Fauna der Bäreninsel Stockholm, kungl. Boktryckeriet, 1903.
Geologie und paläontologie der Subhercynen kreidemulde with Henry Schröder. Berlin, Im vertrieb bei der Königlichen geologischen landesanstalt: Abhandlungen der Königlich preussischen geologischen landesanstalt. neue folge., hft. 56  1909.

References
Preußische Geologische Landesanstalt portrait

German paleontologists
1857 births
1938 deaths